Chiu Chung Man (born 7 October 1969) is a Hong Kong football manager and former footballer who manages Biu Chun Rangers.

Career

Playing career

Chiu started his career with Hong Kong side May Ching. In 1988, he signed for  South China in the Hong Kong top flight, helping them win 3 consecutive league titles. In 1997, he signed for Sing Tao.

Managerial career

In 2012, Chiu was appointed manager of Hong Kong top flight club Sun Hei. In 2014, he was appointed manager of Wong Tai Sin. In 2016, he was appointed manager of King Fung. In 2017, he was appointed manager of Sun Hei in the Hong Kong second tier, where despite being suspended as a manager he substituted himself on on during a league game against Kwun Tong due to not realizing that manage suspensions also applied to player suspensions and was fined and had to forfeit the game.

References

External links

 
 Chiu Chung Man at playmakerstats.com

1969 births
Association football midfielders
Double Flower FA players
Hong Kong First Division League players
Hong Kong Premier League players
Hong Kong football managers
Hong Kong footballers
Hong Kong international footballers
Resources Capital FC players
South China AA players
Sun Hei SC players
Living people